Bombyx is the genus of true silk moths or mulberry silk moths of the family Bombycidae, also known as silkworms, which are the larvae or caterpillars of silk moths. The genus was erected as a subgenus by Carl Linnaeus in his 10th edition of Systema Naturae (1758).

Species
 Bombyx horsfieldi (Moore, 1860)
 Bombyx huttoni Westwood, 1847
 Bombyx incomposita van Eecke, 1929
 Bombyx lemeepauli Lemée, 1950
 Bombyx mandarina (Moore, 1872) – wild silk moth
 Bombyx mori (Linnaeus, 1758) – domestic silk moth
 Bombyx rotundapex Miyata & Kishida, 1990
 Bombyx shini Park and Sohn, 2002

Hybrids
Two instances of semi-natural hybridisation are known within this genus:
 Bombyx hybrid, a hybrid between a male B. mandarina and a female B. mori
 Bombyx second hybrid, a hybrid between a male B. mori and a female B. mandarina

Food
The caterpillars feed on Moraceae, especially on mulberries (Morus species). Domestic silkworms may be fed artificial mulberry chow.

References

Bombycidae
Moth genera